Gastonia may refer to:

Gastonia (plant), a genus in the ivy or ginseng family
Gastonia (dinosaur), a genus of ankylosaur
Gastonia, North Carolina, United States
Gastonia, Texas, an unincorporated community
Gastonia novels, several novels concerned with the events of the 1929 Loray Mill strike